Neocicindela is a genus of tiger beetles endemic to New Zealand. Species include N. tuberculata, N. garnerae and several others. Several former species of Neocicindela have been transferred to a new genus Zecicindela.

Gallery

References

External links
 iNaturalist World Checklist
 
 

Cicindelidae